The 1988 VFL season was the 92nd season of the Victorian Football League (VFL), the highest level senior Australian rules football competition and administrative body in Victoria, and by reason of it featuring clubs from New South Wales, Queensland and Western Australia, the de facto highest level senior competition in Australia. The season featured fourteen clubs, ran from 2 April until 24 September, and comprised a 22-game home-and-away season followed by a finals series featuring the top five clubs. 

The premiership was won by the Hawthorn Football Club for the seventh time, after it defeated  by 96 points in the 1988 VFL Grand Final.

Night series
Hawthorn 10.10 (70) defeated Geelong 9.13 (67) in the Night Series, which for the first time was played entirely as a pre-season competition, rather than a concurrent competition to the Premiership season.

Premiership season

Round 1

|- style="background:#ccf;"
| Home team
| Home team score
| Away team
| Away team score
| Venue
| Crowd
| Date
|- style="background:#fff;"
| 
| 11.17 (83)
| 
| 14.20 (104)
| Kardinia Park
| 20,981
| 2 April 1988
|- style="background:#fff;"
| 
| 25.14 (164)
| 
| 12.10 (82)
| Windy Hill
| 18,390
| 2 April 1988
|- style="background:#fff;"
| 
| 18.18 (126)
| 
| 15.21 (111)
| Princes Park
| 28,141
| 2 April 1988
|- style="background:#fff;"
| 
| 10.15 (75)
| 
| 11.17 (83)
| Carrara Stadium
| 11,306
| 3 April 1988
|- style="background:#fff;"
| 
| 20.20 (140)
| 
| 17.16 (118)
| Princes Park
| 18,774
| 4 April 1988
|- style="background:#fff;"
| 
| 16.12 (108)
| 
| 23.16 (154)
| MCG
| 34,824
| 4 April 1988
|- style="background:#fff;"
| 
| 16.6 (102)
| 
| 11.10 (76)
| VFL Park
| 18,980
| 4 April 1988

Round 2

|- style="background:#ccf;"
| Home team
| Home team score
| Away team
| Away team score
| Venue
| Crowd
| Date
|- style="background:#fff;"
| 
| 26.19 (175)
| 
| 11.10 (76)
| WACA Ground
| 24,886
| 8 April 1988
|- style="background:#fff;"
| 
| 9.12 (66)
| 
| 13.8 (86)
| Western Oval
| 15,693
| 9 April 1988
|- style="background:#fff;"
| 
| 15.12 (102)
| 
| 9.16 (70)
| Victoria Park
| 26,158
| 9 April 1988
|- style="background:#fff;"
| 
| 20.7 (127)
| 
| 21.16 (142)
| MCG
| 15,233
| 9 April 1988
|- style="background:#fff;"
| 
| 19.15 (129)
| 
| 7.19 (61)
| Princes Park
| 16,891
| 9 April 1988
|- style="background:#fff;"
| 
| 26.15 (171)
| 
| 12.14 (86)
| VFL Park
| 18,082
| 9 April 1988
|- style="background:#fff;"
| 
| 9.12 (66)
| 
| 7.13 (55)
| SCG
| 9,000
| 10 April 1988

Round 3

|- style="background:#ccf;"
| Home team
| Home team score
| Away team
| Away team score
| Venue
| Crowd
| Date
|- style="background:#fff;"
| 
| 17.12 (114)
| 
| 13.15 (93)
| Princes Park
| 9,921
| 16 April 1988
|- style="background:#fff;"
| 
| 17.6 (108)
| 
| 11.16 (82)
| Moorabbin Oval
| 16,573
| 16 April 1988
|- style="background:#fff;"
| 
| 9.18 (72)
| 
| 9.10 (64)
| MCG
| 30,870
| 16 April 1988
|- style="background:#fff;"
| 
| 16.12 (108)
| 
| 7.15 (57)
| Western Oval
| 12,683
| 16 April 1988
|- style="background:#fff;"
| 
| 11.13 (79)
| 
| 23.13 (151)
| Windy Hill
| 21,311
| 16 April 1988
|- style="background:#fff;"
| 
| 12.8 (80)
| 
| 23.12 (150)
| VFL Park
| 34,444
| 16 April 1988
|- style="background:#fff;"
| 
| 10.14 (74)
| 
| 29.18 (192)
| WACA Ground
| 16,354
| 17 April 1988

Round 4

|- style="background:#ccf;"
| Home team
| Home team score
| Away team
| Away team score
| Venue
| Crowd
| Date
|- style="background:#fff;"
| 
| 13.18 (96)
| 
| 5.11 (41)
| MCG
| 18,908
| 22 April 1988
|- style="background:#fff;"
| 
| 13.16 (94)
| 
| 8.7 (55)
| Victoria Park
| 26,276
| 23 April 1988
|- style="background:#fff;"
| 
| 17.18 (120)
| 
| 15.16 (106)
| Princes Park
| 13,299
| 23 April 1988
|- style="background:#fff;"
| 
| 19.11 (125)
| 
| 13.9 (87)
| VFL Park
| 14,948
| 23 April 1988
|- style="background:#fff;"
| 
| 10.20 (80)
| 
| 24.22 (166)
| SCG
| 16,091
| 24 April 1988
|- style="background:#fff;"
| 
| 11.16 (82)
| 
| 24.17 (161)
| MCG
| 27,417
| 25 April 1988
|- style="background:#fff;"
| 
| 10.9 (69)
| 
| 14.7 (91)
| Moorabbin Oval
| 31,679
| 25 April 1988

Round 5

|- style="background:#ccf;"
| Home team
| Home team score
| Away team
| Away team score
| Venue
| Crowd
| Date
|- style="background:#fff;"
| 
| 14.16 (100)
| 
| 14.9 (93)
| WACA Ground
| 17,662
| 29 April 1988
|- style="background:#fff;"
| 
| 12.19 (91)
| 
| 23.15 (153)
| Princes Park
| 8,941
| 30 April 1988
|- style="background:#fff;"
| 
| 19.14 (128)
| 
| 31.19 (205)
| MCG
| 15,438
| 30 April 1988
|- style="background:#fff;"
| 
| 17.14 (116)
| 
| 13.14 (92)
| Kardinia Park
| 23,805
| 30 April 1988
|- style="background:#fff;"
| 
| 12.12 (84)
| 
| 13.15 (93)
| Moorabbin Oval
| 15,260
| 30 April 1988
|- style="background:#fff;"
| 
| 10.9 (69)
| 
| 14.13 (97)
| VFL Park
| 76,354
| 30 April 1988
|- style="background:#fff;"
| 
| 12.17 (89)
| 
| 17.14 (116)
| SCG
| 9,269
| 1 May 1988

Round 6

|- style="background:#ccf;"
| Home team
| Home team score
| Away team
| Away team score
| Venue
| Crowd
| Date
|- style="background:#fff;"
| 
| 17.21 (123)
| 
| 17.8 (110)
| MCG
| 11,133
| 6 May 1988
|- style="background:#fff;"
| 
| 12.19 (91)
| 
| 5.16 (46)
| Western Oval
| 12,374
| 7 May 1988
|- style="background:#fff;"
| 
| 10.12 (72)
| 
| 4.8 (32)
| Princes Park
| 15,812
| 7 May 1988
|- style="background:#fff;"
| 
| 9.14 (68)
| 
| 16.5 (101)
| MCG
| 34,679
| 7 May 1988
|- style="background:#fff;"
| 
| 13.13 (91)
| 
| 14.9 (93)
| VFL Park
| 53,184
| 7 May 1988
|- style="background:#fff;"
| 
| 16.15 (111)
| 
| 17.12 (114)
| Kardinia Park
| 19,106
| 8 May 1988
|- style="background:#fff;"
| 
| 17.11 (113)
| 
| 16.15 (111)
| Carrara Stadium
| 9,981
| 8 May 1988

Round 7

|- style="background:#ccf;"
| Home team
| Home team score
| Away team
| Away team score
| Venue
| Crowd
| Date
|- style="background:#fff;"
| 
| 17.10 (112)
| 
| 3.18 (36)
| WACA Ground
| 12,803
| 13 May 1988
|- style="background:#fff;"
| 
| 15.16 (106)
| 
| 9.13 (67)
| Princes Park
| 8,568
| 14 May 1988
|- style="background:#fff;"
| 
| 15.21 (111)
| 
| 13.12 (90)
| MCG
| 34,773
| 14 May 1988
|- style="background:#fff;"
| 
| 17.17 (119)
| 
| 11.9 (75)
| Windy Hill
| 24,323
| 14 May 1988
|- style="background:#fff;"
| 
| 15.14 (104)
| 
| 14.9 (93)
| VFL Park
| 26,372
| 14 May 1988
|- style="background:#fff;"
| 
| 10.12 (72)
| 
| 9.17 (71)
| Carrara Stadium
| 10,898
| 15 May 1988
|- style="background:#fff;"
| 
| 11.7 (73)
| 
| 22.18 (150)
| MCG
| 12,880
| 15 May 1988

Round 8

|- style="background:#ccf;"
| Home team
| Home team score
| Away team
| Away team score
| Venue
| Crowd
| Date
|- style="background:#fff;"
| 
| 11.21 (87)
| 
| 17.13 (115)
| SCG
| 13,322
| 20 May 1988
|- style="background:#fff;"
| 
| 12.17 (89)
| 
| 17.13 (115)
| Princes Park
| 12,997
| 21 May 1988
|- style="background:#fff;"
| 
| 20.17 (137)
| 
| 13.11 (89)
| Windy Hill
| 14,520
| 21 May 1988
|- style="background:#fff;"
| 
| 13.10 (88)
| 
| 11.16 (82)
| Victoria Park
| 22,683
| 21 May 1988
|- style="background:#fff;"
| 
| 19.20 (134)
| 
| 19.7 (121)
| VFL Park
| 22,978
| 21 May 1988
|- style="background:#fff;"
| 
| 16.12 (108)
| 
| 17.12 (114)
| Kardinia Park
| 20,345
| 22 May 1988
|- style="background:#fff;"
| 
| 9.9 (63)
| 
| 17.14 (116)
| Subiaco Oval
| 27,024
| 22 May 1988

Round 9

|- style="background:#ccf;"
| Home team
| Home team score
| Away team
| Away team score
| Venue
| Crowd
| Date
|- style="background:#fff;"
| 
| 29.20 (194)
| 
| 8.6 (54)
| MCG
| 26,653
| 27 May 1988
|- style="background:#fff;"
| 
| 10.13 (73)
| 
| 20.16 (136)
| MCG
| 11,468
| 28 May 1988
|- style="background:#fff;"
| 
| 16.10 (106)
| 
| 11.12 (78)
| Moorabbin Oval
| 21,334
| 28 May 1988
|- style="background:#fff;"
| 
| 23.16 (154)
| 
| 9.11 (65)
| Princes Park
| 12,786
| 28 May 1988
|- style="background:#fff;"
| 
| 20.13 (133)
| 
| 15.10 (100)
| Kardinia Park
| 13,962
| 28 May 1988
|- style="background:#fff;"
| 
| 4.11 (35)
| 
| 11.17 (83)
| VFL Park
| 28,849
| 28 May 1988
|- style="background:#fff;"
| 
| 12.15 (87)
| 
| 15.10 (100)
| Subiaco Oval
| 27,184
| 29 May 1988

Round 10

|- style="background:#ccf;"
| Home team
| Home team score
| Away team
| Away team score
| Venue
| Crowd
| Date
|- style="background:#fff;"
| 
| 11.11 (77)
| 
| 8.7 (55)
| SCG
| 14,753
| 3 June 1988
|- style="background:#fff;"
| 
| 24.13 (157)
| 
| 18.16 (124)
| Princes Park
| 8,395
| 4 June 1988
|- style="background:#fff;"
| 
| 17.19 (121)
| 
| 21.11 (137)
| MCG
| 25,693
| 4 June 1988
|- style="background:#fff;"
| 
| 10.11 (71)
| 
| 12.12 (84)
| VFL Park
| 61,163
| 4 June 1988
|- style="background:#fff;"
| 
| 11.9 (75)
| 
| 15.6 (96)
| Western Oval
| 17,515
| 4 June 1988
|- style="background:#fff;"
| 
| 16.20 (116)
| 
| 10.15 (75)
| MCG
| 7,157
| 5 June 1988
|- style="background:#fff;"
| 
| 16.13 (109)
| 
| 24.18 (162)
| Carrara Stadium
| 8,637
| 5 June 1988

Round 11

|- style="background:#ccf;"
| Home team
| Home team score
| Away team
| Away team score
| Venue
| Crowd
| Date
|- style="background:#fff;"
| 
| 18.24 (132)
| 
| 19.11 (125)
| SCG
| 11,729
| 10 June 1988
|- style="background:#fff;"
| 
| 21.18 (144)
| 
| 15.11 (101)
| Princes Park
| 21,900
| 11 June 1988
|- style="background:#fff;"
| 
| 7.9 (51)
| 
| 11.12 (78)
| VFL Park
| 24,149
| 11 June 1988
|- style="background:#fff;"
| 
| 23.13 (151)
| 
| 15.13 (103)
| Carrara Stadium
| 13,222
| 12 June 1988
|- style="background:#fff;"
| 
| 13.15 (93)
| 
| 10.13 (73)
| MCG
| 28,045
| 13 June 1988
|- style="background:#fff;"
| 
| 17.16 (118)
| 
| 10.8 (68)
| Princes Park
| 28,590
| 13 June 1988
|- style="background:#fff;"
| 
| 9.10 (64)
| 
| 16.7 (103)
| Kardinia Park
| 34,789
| 13 June 1988

Round 12

|- style="background:#ccf;"
| Home team
| Home team score
| Away team
| Away team score
| Venue
| Crowd
| Date
|- style="background:#fff;"
| 
| 15.20 (110)
| 
| 12.21 (93)
| MCG
| 19,458
| 17 June 1988
|- style="background:#fff;"
| 
| 7.14 (56)
| 
| 3.12 (30)
| Western Oval
| 13,720
| 18 June 1988
|- style="background:#fff;"
| 
| 10.14 (74)
| 
| 7.19 (61)
| MCG
| 18,078
| 18 June 1988
|- style="background:#fff;"
| 
| 3.12 (30)
| 
| 7.9 (51)
| Moorabbin Oval
| 23,880
| 18 June 1988
|- style="background:#fff;"
| 
| 10.20 (80)
| 
| 2.5 (17)
| Princes Park
| 8,377
| 18 June 1988
|- style="background:#fff;"
| 
| 7.9 (51)
| 
| 4.9 (33)
| VFL Park
| 18,854
| 18 June 1988
|- style="background:#fff;"
| 
| 14.20 (104)
| 
| 8.13 (61)
| SCG
| 12,624
| 19 June 1988

Round 13

|- style="background:#ccf;"
| Home team
| Home team score
| Away team
| Away team score
| Venue
| Crowd
| Date
|- style="background:#fff;"
| 
| 10.15 (75)
| 
| 15.9 (99)
| Windy Hill
| 15,861
| 25 June 1988
|- style="background:#fff;"
| 
| 9.14 (68)
| 
| 2.11 (23)
| Victoria Park
| 23,031
| 25 June 1988
|- style="background:#fff;"
| 
| 8.18 (66)
| 
| 5.11 (41)
| Moorabbin Oval
| 17,770
| 25 June 1988
|- style="background:#fff;"
| 
| 17.10 (112)
| 
| 12.15 (87)
| Princes Park
| 14,048
| 25 June 1988
|- style="background:#fff;"
| 
| 22.19 (151)
| 
| 13.7 (85)
| MCG
| 7,764
| 25 June 1988
|- style="background:#fff;"
| 
| 10.6 (66)
| 
| 5.13 (43)
| VFL Park
| 37,953
| 25 June 1988
|- style="background:#fff;"
| 
| 17.19 (121)
| 
| 13.9 (87)
| Subiaco Oval
| 14,827
| 26 June 1988

Round 14

|- style="background:#ccf;"
| Home team
| Home team score
| Away team
| Away team score
| Venue
| Crowd
| Date
|- style="background:#fff;"
| 
| 13.18 (96)
| 
| 19.17 (131)
| SCG
| 8,008
| 1 July 1988
|- style="background:#fff;"
| 
| 8.8 (56)
| 
| 13.11 (89)
| Kardinia Park
| 16,777
| 2 July 1988
|- style="background:#fff;"
| 
| 11.11 (77)
| 
| 15.15 (105)
| Western Oval
| 14,338
| 2 July 1988
|- style="background:#fff;"
| 
| 16.16 (112)
| 
| 13.7 (85)
| Windy Hill
| 10,274
| 2 July 1988
|- style="background:#fff;"
| 
| 10.11 (71)
| 
| 15.20 (110)
| VFL Park
| 10,310
| 2 July 1988
|- style="background:#fff;"
| 
| 11.21 (87)
| 
| 16.14 (110)
| MCG
| 72,906
| 2 July 1988
|- style="background:#fff;"
| 
| 14.15 (99)
| 
| 12.17 (89)
| Carrara Stadium
| 10,394
| 3 July 1988

Round 15

|- style="background:#ccf;"
| Home team
| Home team score
| Away team
| Away team score
| Venue
| Crowd
| Date
|- style="background:#fff;"
| 
| 8.9 (57)
| 
| 19.16 (130)
| MCG
| 20,269
| 9 July 1988
|- style="background:#fff;"
| 
| 21.16 (142)
| 
| 7.10 (52)
| Princes Park
| 13,961
| 9 July 1988
|- style="background:#fff;"
| 
| 9.11 (65)
| 
| 10.9 (69)
| Moorabbin Oval
| 15,416
| 9 July 1988
|- style="background:#fff;"
| 
| 12.8 (80)
| 
| 8.7 (55)
| VFL Park
| 14,721
| 9 July 1988
|- style="background:#fff;"
| 
| 12.19 (91)
| 
| 17.13 (115)
| Carrara Stadium
| 14,213
| 10 July 1988
|- style="background:#fff;"
| 
| 18.18 (126)
| 
| 16.10 (106)
| Subiaco Oval
| 18,536
| 10 July 1988
|- style="background:#fff;"
| 
| 14.10 (94)
| 
| 21.14 (140)
| MCG
| 26,755
| 10 July 1988

Round 16

|- style="background:#ccf;"
| Home team
| Home team score
| Away team
| Away team score
| Venue
| Crowd
| Date
|- style="background:#fff;"
| 
| 14.14 (98)
| 
| 12.17 (89)
| WACA Ground
| 15,831
| 15 July 1988
|- style="background:#fff;"
| 
| 16.14 (110)
| 
| 9.12 (66)
| Windy Hill
| 14,467
| 16 July 1988
|- style="background:#fff;"
| 
| 21.15 (141)
| 
| 14.14 (98)
| Princes Park
| 17,821
| 16 July 1988
|- style="background:#fff;"
| 
| 14.10 (94)
| 
| 6.12 (48)
| MCG
| 74,964
| 16 July 1988
|- style="background:#fff;"
| 
| 17.13 (115)
| 
| 15.8 (98)
| VFL Park
| 20,199
| 16 July 1988
|- style="background:#fff;"
| 
| 24.19 (163)
| 
| 16.16 (112)
| SCG
| 14,591
| 17 July 1988
|- style="background:#fff;"
| 
| 12.14 (86)
| 
| 16.17 (113)
| MCG
| 16,872
| 17 July 1988

Round 17

|- style="background:#ccf;"
| Home team
| Home team score
| Away team
| Away team score
| Venue
| Crowd
| Date
|- style="background:#fff;"
| 
| 19.20 (134)
| 
| 8.16 (64)
| MCG
| 7,611
| 22 July 1988
|- style="background:#fff;"
| 
| 14.8 (92)
| 
| 13.21 (99)
| Moorabbin Oval
| 11,657
| 23 July 1988
|- style="background:#fff;"
| 
| 14.8 (92)
| 
| 13.14 (92)
| Victoria Park
| 16,082
| 23 July 1988
|- style="background:#fff;"
| 
| 13.22 (100)
| 
| 8.12 (60)
| Princes Park
| 17,503
| 23 July 1988
|- style="background:#fff;"
| 
| 17.13 (115)
| 
| 10.9 (69)
| Kardinia Park
| 13,492
| 23 July 1988
|- style="background:#fff;"
| 
| 10.8 (68)
| 
| 21.11 (137)
| VFL Park
| 37,307
| 23 July 1988
|- style="background:#fff;"
| 
| 10.14 (74)
| 
| 16.7 (103)
| Carrara Stadium
| 15,950
| 24 July 1988

Round 18

|- style="background:#ccf;"
| Home team
| Home team score
| Away team
| Away team score
| Venue
| Crowd
| Date
|- style="background:#fff;"
| 
| 12.16 (88)
| 
| 22.19 (151)
| SCG
| 12,228
| 29 July 1988
|- style="background:#fff;"
| 
| 16.13 (109)
| 
| 21.14 (140)
| MCG
| 11,909
| 30 July 1988
|- style="background:#fff;"
| 
| 16.18 (114)
| 
| 11.14 (80)
| Victoria Park
| 16,408
| 30 July 1988
|- style="background:#fff;"
| 
| 9.13 (67)
| 
| 22.11 (143)
| Princes Park
| 15,467
| 30 July 1988
|- style="background:#fff;"
| 
| 12.16 (88)
| 
| 9.8 (62)
| VFL Park
| 35,662
| 30 July 1988
|- style="background:#fff;"
| 
| 18.14 (122)
| 
| 11.12 (78)
| Subiaco Oval
| 16,188
| 31 July 1988
|- style="background:#fff;"
| 
| 11.18 (84)
| 
| 5.13 (43)
| Western Oval
| 11,694
| 31 July 1988

Round 19

|- style="background:#ccf;"
| Home team
| Home team score
| Away team
| Away team score
| Venue
| Crowd
| Date
|- style="background:#fff;"
| 
| 18.14 (122)
| 
| 11.10 (76)
| MCG
| 20,575
| 5 August 1988
|- style="background:#fff;"
| 
| 19.18 (132)
| 
| 9.9 (63)
| Western Oval
| 10,477
| 6 August 1988
|- style="background:#fff;"
| 
| 12.18 (90)
| 
| 24.13 (157)
| Windy Hill
| 15,641
| 6 August 1988
|- style="background:#fff;"
| 
| 23.11 (149)
| 
| 20.11 (131)
| MCG
| 20,475
| 6 August 1988
|- style="background:#fff;"
| 
| 27.16 (178)
| 
| 15.14 (104)
| Princes Park
| 12,836
| 6 August 1988
|- style="background:#fff;"
| 
| 11.13 (79)
| 
| 15.17 (107)
| VFL Park
| 18,355
| 6 August 1988
|- style="background:#fff;"
| 
| 16.19 (115)
| 
| 12.12 (84)
| Subiaco Oval
| 18,089
| 7 August 1988

Round 20

|- style="background:#ccf;"
| Home team
| Home team score
| Away team
| Away team score
| Venue
| Crowd
| Date
|- style="background:#fff;"
| 
| 11.20 (86)
| 
| 14.16 (100)
| MCG
| 15,026
| 12 August 1988
|- style="background:#fff;"
| 
| 13.10 (88)
| 
| 14.13 (97)
| Moorabbin Oval
| 11,074
| 13 August 1988
|- style="background:#fff;"
| 
| 20.21 (141)
| 
| 20.17 (137)
| Princes Park
| 16,723
| 13 August 1988
|- style="background:#fff;"
| 
| 14.16 (100)
| 
| 17.8 (110)
| MCG
| 27,026
| 13 August 1988
|- style="background:#fff;"
| 
| 10.14 (74)
| 
| 10.13 (73)
| VFL Park
| 52,719
| 13 August 1988
|- style="background:#fff;"
| 
| 10.8 (68)
| 
| 19.14 (128)
| Kardinia Park
| 22,000
| 14 August 1988
|- style="background:#fff;"
| 
| 24.16 (160)
| 
| 14.13 (97)
| SCG
| 13,811
| 14 August 1988

Round 21

|- style="background:#ccf;"
| Home team
| Home team score
| Away team
| Away team score
| Venue
| Crowd
| Date
|- style="background:#fff;"
| 
| 16.17 (113)
| 
| 14.17 (101)
| MCG
| 14,772
| 19 August 1988
|- style="background:#fff;"
| 
| 22.14 (146)
| 
| 16.12 (108)
| Kardinia Park
| 14,338
| 20 August 1988
|- style="background:#fff;"
| 
| 19.13 (127)
| 
| 17.11 (113)
| Princes Park
| 13,028
| 20 August 1988
|- style="background:#fff;"
| 
| 19.14 (128)
| 
| 13.12 (90)
| Windy Hill
| 19,863
| 20 August 1988
|- style="background:#fff;"
| 
| 18.15 (123)
| 
| 11.12 (78)
| VFL Park
| 19,222
| 20 August 1988
|- style="background:#fff;"
| 
| 14.13 (97)
| 
| 13.22 (100)
| Carrara Stadium
| 16,727
| 21 August 1988
|- style="background:#fff;"
| 
| 16.15 (111)
| 
| 7.9 (51)
| Subiaco Oval
| 36,116
| 21 August 1988

Round 22

|- style="background:#ccf;"
| Home team
| Home team score
| Away team
| Away team score
| Venue
| Crowd
| Date
|- style="background:#fff;"
| 
| 23.19 (157)
| 
| 7.12 (54)
| MCG
| 19,496
| 26 August 1988
|- style="background:#fff;"
| 
| 28.16 (184)
| 
| 13.11 (89)
| Princes Park
| 12,117
| 27 August 1988
|- style="background:#fff;"
| 
| 19.15 (129)
| 
| 14.10 (94)
| Victoria Park
| 19,813
| 27 August 1988
|- style="background:#fff;"
| 
| 14.12 (96)
| 
| 10.6 (66)
| MCG
| 50,178
| 27 August 1988
|- style="background:#fff;"
| 
| 12.12 (84)
| 
| 8.17 (65)
| VFL Park
| 26,134
| 27 August 1988
|- style="background:#fff;"
| 
| 11.11 (77)
| 
| 10.21 (81)
| Carrara Stadium
| 12,718
| 28 August 1988
|- style="background:#fff;"
| 
| 3.11 (29)
| 
| 7.11 (53)
| Western Oval
| 18,456
| 28 August 1988

Ladder

Finals

Elimination finals

|- style="background:#ccf;"
| Home team
| Score
| Away team
| Score
| Venue
| Attendance
| Date
|- style="background:#fff;"
| 
| 10.11 (71)
| 
| 11.7 (73)
| Waverley Park
| 43,438
| Saturday, 3 September

Qualifying final

|- style="background:#ccf;"
| Home team
| Score
| Away team
| Score
| Venue
| Attendance
| Date
|- style="background:#fff;"
| 
| 22.13 (145)
| 
| 16.11 (107)
| MCG
| 83,032
| Sunday, 4 September

Semi finals

|- style="background:#ccf;"
| Home team
| Score
| Away team
| Score
| Venue
| Attendance
| Date
|- style="background:#fff;"
| 
| 9.12 (66)
| 
| 6.9 (45)
| Waverley Park
| 60,052
| Saturday, 10 September
|- style="background:#fff;"
| 
| 12.10 (82)
| 
| 13.17 (95)
| MCG
| 87,407
| Sunday, 11 September

Preliminary final

|- style="background:#ccf;"
| Home team
| Score
| Away team
| Score
| Venue
| Attendance
| Date
|- style="background:#fff;"
| 
| 14.14 (98)
| 
| 19.6 (120)
| Waverly Park
| 68,516
| Saturday, 17 September

Grand Final

|- style="background:#ccf;"
| Home team
| Score
| Away team
| Score
| Venue
| Attendance
| Date
|- style="background:#fff;"
| 
| 22.20 (152)
| 
| 6.20 (56)
| Melbourne Cricket Ground
| 93,754
| Saturday, 24 September

Player statistics and awards

Leading goalkickers

Brownlow Medal count

 The Leigh Matthews Trophy was awarded to Gerard Healy of the Sydney Swans.
 The Norm Smith Medal was awarded to Gary Ayres of Hawthorn.
 The Under 19's Grand Final was won by North Melbourne against Essendon.
 The Reserves Grand Final was won by Footscray against North Melbourne.
 The Seniors Grand Final was won by Hawthorn against Melbourne.

Notable events
Three new rules aimed at encouraging a long-kicking style of play were introduced. These were:
The length of the 15-metre penalty for wasting an opponent's time after he takes a mark was increased to fifty metres.
Players were required to take a kick if awarded a free kick. If the player played on by handpass, the ball would be returned for a ball-up; the penalty for playing on was originally a free kick to the opposition, but this was commuted to a ball up after proving unpopular during pre-season trials.
The full-back was required to kick the ball over a distance of at least two metres when kicking in after a behind.
The VFL banned lace-up guernseys starting from this season after Robert Flower and Brian Wilson both suffered broken fingers when they became tangled in the laces during tackles. A handful of players had been wearing the tight-fitting guernseys which were laced up in the front in recent years.
The Brisbane Bears played two matches in Perth during the season. At the club's suggestion, Brisbane's home match against the West Coast Eagles in Round 3 was moved from Carrara Stadium in Gold Coast to the WACA Ground in Perth after persistent and heavy rain in south-eastern Queensland left the ground and its adjoining facilities unable to accommodate the game. Brisbane had expected the clubs' Round 16 match to be moved from Perth to Gold Coast in return, only to discover that the league considered the Round 3 match a home game for Brisbane, meaning that they would be required to travel for the Round 16 match in Perth as well.
The VFL took over the operation of the financially crippled Sydney Swans during the year until its parent company, Powerplay, could find a buyer for the franchise. The VFL bought the club for a nominal $10 on 9 May, taking on its operating costs but not its debts.
 North Melbourne 18.16 (124) defeated Essendon 06.05 (41) in the under 19's grand final, held as a curtain-raiser to the reserves grand final on 24 September at the Melbourne Cricket Ground.
 Footscray 17.14 (116) defeated North Melbourne 14.12 (96) in the reserves Grand Final, held as a curtain-raiser to the seniors Grand Final on 24 September at the Melbourne Cricket Ground.

See also
 List of VFL debuts in 1988
 McIntyre "Final Five" system

References

Bibliography
 Stephen Rodgers: Every Game Ever Played VFL/AFL Results 1897–1991 3rd Edition 1992. Penguin Books Australia .

External links
 1988 VFL Season Statistics at AFL Tables

Australian Football League seasons
VFL season